In enzymology, a salutaridine reductase (NADPH) is an enzyme that catalyzes the chemical reaction

salutaridinol + NADP+  salutaridine + NADPH + H+

Thus, the two substrates of this enzyme are salutaridinol and NADP+, whereas its 3 products are salutaridine, NADPH, and H+.

This enzyme belongs to the family of oxidoreductases, specifically those acting on the CH-OH group of donor with NAD+ or NADP+ as acceptor. The systematic name of this enzyme class is salutaridinol:NADP+ 7-oxidoreductase. This enzyme participates in alkaloid biosynthesis i.

References

 

EC 1.1.1
NADPH-dependent enzymes
Enzymes of unknown structure